Psylla (from the Greek psulla, meaning flea) is a genus of sap-sucking insects belonging to the order Hemiptera.  There are at least 110 described species in Psylla. Species within the genus feed on various host plants.

Some harmful species commonly known as flies belong to neighbouring genera, such as Cacopsylla (which includes most of the pyslla harmful to fruit trees), the Albizia fly (Acizzia jamatonica, from the Psyllidae family) and the laurel fly (Trioza alacris).

Species and hosts 
 Psylla alni feeds on alders
 Psylla apicalis feeds on kowhai trees
 Psylla betulae feeds on birches
 Psylla buxi feeds on box (Buxus species)
 Psylla cordata feeds on limes (Tilia species)
 Psylla frodobagginsi feeds on kowhai trees
 Psylla oblonga feeds on Albizia odoratissima
 Psylla pyri feeds on European pear trees

See also
 List of Psylla species

References

Psyllidae
Psylloidea genera
Taxa named by Étienne Louis Geoffroy